Saint-Prime is a municipality in Quebec, Canada, located within the regional county municipality of Le Domaine-du-Roy. The municipality had a population of 2,758 as of the Canada 2011 Census, and a land area of 147.16 km2.

Demographics
Population trend:
 Population in 2011: 2758 (2006 to 2011 population change: 3.6%)
 Population in 2006: 2661
 Population in 2001: 2702
 Population in 1996: 2685
 Population in 1991: 2522

Private dwellings occupied by usual residents: 1,094 (total dwellings: 1,216)

Mother tongue:
 English as first language: 0%
 French as first language: 98.9%
 English and French as first language: 0%
 Other as first language: 1.1%

Climate
Saint-Prime has a humid continental climate that is some way above the subarctic classification due to its warm summers. Winters, however, are very cold and the seasonal differences are severe, although not extreme by Canadian or Quebec standards. Precipitation levels are high, bringing much snowfall in winter, but are by no means extreme compared to adjacent areas.

References

External links

See also 
Le Domaine-du-Roy Regional County Municipality
Lac Saint-Jean, a waterbody
Rivière à l'Ours (Ashuapmushuan River)
Rivière du Castor (rivière à l'Ours)
Ovide River
Rivière aux Iroquois
Rivière à la Chasse (lac Saint-Jean)

Municipalities in Quebec
Incorporated places in Saguenay–Lac-Saint-Jean